MIAS may refer to:

 Maryknoll Institute of African Studies, educational institute, see Maryknoll
 MIAs, plural of Missing in Action
 Moscow International Automobile Salon, auto show in Russia
 Montreal International Auto Show, auto show in Canada
 Manila International Auto Show, auto show in the Philippines